Oren Stone (July 24, 1833 – April 20, 1897) was a Michigan politician.

Early life
On July 24, 1833, Stone was born in Auburn, Cayuga County, N.Y.  He started Flint Woolen Mills with a partner and was owner of Stone's Opera House.

Political life
He was elected as the Mayor of City of Flint in 1888 for a single 1-year term.

Post-political life
Buried in Flint's Glenwood Cemetery, Stone died in Flint on April 20, 1897.

References

Mayors of Flint, Michigan
1833 births
1897 deaths
19th-century American politicians
Burials at Glenwood Cemetery (Flint, Michigan)